Garra lorestanensis is a species of ray-finned fish in the genus Garra Known from the Loven Cave, the natural outlet of a subterranean limestone system of the Zagros Mountains in the Ab-e Sirum or Ab-e Serum Valley near Tang-e Haft railway 
station, the Tigris River drainage, the Persian Gulf Basin, Lorestan Province, southwestern Iran.

Etymology

The species name lorestanensis, treated as an adjective, is derived from Lorestan Province, where the Loven cave is located.

References 

Garra
Taxa named by Hamed Mousavi-Sabet
Taxa named by Soheil Eagderi
Fish described in 2016